Christ Episcopal Church may refer to the following similarly named churches or parishes in the United States:

Alabama 
 Christ Episcopal Church (Tuscaloosa, Alabama), a historic church building in Tuscaloosa, Alabama

California 
 Christ Episcopal Church (Coronado, California), a church whose construction was funded by Charles T. Hinde

Colorado 
 Christ Episcopal Church (Cañon City, Colorado), listed on the National Register of Historic Places (N.R.H.P.)

Connecticut 
 Christ Episcopal Church (Bethlehem, Connecticut)
 Christ Episcopal Church (Ansonia, Connecticut), in Ansonia, Connecticut

Delaware
 Christ Church, Milford, Delaware

Florida 
 Christ Episcopal Church (Monticello, Florida), a historic Carpenter Gothic styled architecture Episcopal church

Georgia 
 Christ Episcopal Church (Macon, Georgia), listed on the N.R.H.P. in Bibb County
Christ Church (Savannah, Georgia)
Christ Church (St. Simons, Georgia)

Illinois 
 Christ Episcopal Church (Joliet, Illinois), an 1884 historic building and former church in Will County
 Christ Episcopal Church (Springfield, Illinois), listed on the N.R.H.P. in Sangamon County

Iowa 
 Christ Episcopal Church (Burlington, Iowa), a historic church building on the National Register of Historic Places

Kentucky 
 Christ Episcopal Church (Elizabethtown, Kentucky), listed on the N.R.H.P. in Hardin County
 Christ Church Cathedral (Lexington, Kentucky), listed on the N.R.H.P. in Fayette County

Louisiana 
 Christ Episcopal Church (Covington, Louisiana), a historic church in St. Tammany Parish
 Christ Episcopal Church (Bastrop, Louisiana), listed on the N.R.H.P. in Morehouse Parish
 Christ Episcopal Church and Cemetery (Napoleonville, Louisiana), listed on the N.R.H.P. in Assumption Parish

Maine 
 Christ Episcopal Church (Gardiner, Maine), an 1820 historic church

Maryland 
 Christ Episcopal Church (Accokeek, Maryland), in Accokeek, Maryland
 Christ Episcopal Church (Baltimore, Maryland), a church where Francis L. Hawks preached 
 Christ Episcopal Church and Cemetery (Cambridge, Maryland), an 1883 historic Episcopal church and cemetery located in Dorchester County, Maryland
 Christ Episcopal Church (Chaptico, Maryland), a 1736 historic church located in St. Mary's County
 Christ Church (Easton, Maryland), an 1840 historic church located in the Episcopal Diocese of Easton
 Christ Episcopal Church (Rockville, Maryland), in the Episcopal Diocese of Washington

Massachusetts 
 Christ Church Episcopal (Fitchburg, Massachusetts), an 1867 church built by architect Richard Upjohn
 Christ Episcopal Church (Medway, Massachusetts), after which the Grace Episcopal Church in Jamestown, North Dakota was modeled
 Christ Episcopal Church (Waltham, Massachusetts), a historic Episcopal church

Minnesota 
 Christ Episcopal Church (Benson, Minnesota), listed on the NRHP in Swift County
 Christ Episcopal Church (Red Wing, Minnesota), a church founded in 1858 in Red Wing, Minnesota

Missouri 
 Christ Episcopal Church (Springfield, Missouri), listed on the NRHP in Greene County

Montana 
 Christ Episcopal Church and Rectory (Sheridan, Montana), listed on the NRHP in Madison County

Nebraska 
 Christ Church Episcopal (Beatrice, Nebraska), listed on the NRHP in Gage County
 Christ Episcopal Church (Sidney, Nebraska), listed on the NRHP in Cheyenne County

New Jersey 
 Christ Episcopal Church (New Brunswick, New Jersey), an 1803 historic church

New York 
 Christ Episcopal Church (Belvidere, New York), a historic Episcopal church in Allegany County
 Christ Episcopal Church (Corning, New York), of which Bennett Sims was a rector
 Christ Episcopal Church (Duanesburg, New York), a 1793 historic church on NY 20 in Schenectady County
 Christ Church New Brighton (Episcopal), in New Brighton, Staten Island, New York
 Christ Episcopal Church (Tarrytown, New York), an 1837 historic Episcopal church
 Christ Episcopal Church (Walton, New York), an 1834 historic Episcopal church building located in Delaware County, New York
 Christ Episcopal Church (Wellsburg, New York), built in 1869
 Christ Episcopal Church (Marlboro, New York), listed on the N.R.H.P. in Ulster County, New York

North Carolina 
 Christ Episcopal Church (Raleigh, North Carolina), an 1848 Episcopal church
 Christ Episcopal Church and Parish House (New Bern, North Carolina), listed on the N.R.H.P. in Craven County, North Carolina.
 Christ Episcopal Church (Walnut Cove, North Carolina), listed on the N.R.H.P. in Stokes County, North Carolina.
 Christ Episcopal Church (Cleveland, North Carolina), listed on the N.R.H.P. in Rowan County of Rowan County, North Carolina.

Ohio 
 Christ Episcopal Church (Huron, Ohio), a historic Episcopal church
 Christ Episcopal Church (Oberlin, Ohio), listed on the N.R.H.P. in Lorain County

Pennsylvania 
Christ Episcopal Church (Brownsville, Pennsylvania), historic church built in 1859, features a Tiffany glass window
 Christ Episcopal Church (Reading, Pennsylvania), founded in 1762, is the oldest English-speaking congregation in Reading, Pennsylvania
 Christ Episcopal Church (Stroudsburg, Pennsylvania), a church in Stroudsburg, Pennsylvania, founded in 1897
 Christ Episcopal Church (Williamsport, Pennsylvania), a historical church in Williamsport, Pennsylvania

Rhode Island 
 Christ Episcopal Church (Providence, Rhode Island), a historic Episcopal church

South Carolina 
 Christ Episcopal Church (Florence, South Carolina), listed on the N.R.H.P. in Florence County, South Carolina

Tennessee 
 Christ Episcopal Church (South Pittsburg, Tennessee), listed on the NRHP in Marion County
 Christ Church Episcopal (Rugby, Tennessee), a contributing property in the N.R.H.P. historic district Rugby Colony in Rugby, Tennessee
 Christ Episcopal Church (Tracy City, Tennessee), listed on the NRHP in Grundy County

Texas 
 Christ Episcopal Church (Matagorda, Texas), listed on the N.R.H.P. in Matagorda County

Vermont 
 Christ Episcopal Church (Montpelier, Vermont), an 1840 historic church

Virginia 
 Christ Episcopal Church (Big Stone Gap, Virginia), a historic church**
 Christ Episcopal Church (Lancaster County, Virginia), a historic church

 Christ Church (Norfolk, Virginia), now demolished, where bishop Thomas Atkinson served
 Christ and Grace Episcopal Church (Petersburg, Virginia), a historic church
 Christ Church (Saluda, Virginia), a historic church
 Christ Episcopal Church (Winchester, Virginia), a historic church

Washington 
 Christ Episcopal Church (Puyallup, Washington), listed on the N.R.H.P. in Pierce County

Washington, D.C. 
Christ Church (Georgetown, Washington, D.C.), listed on the National Register of Historic Places.
Christ Church, Washington Parish, listed on the National Register of Historic Places.

Wisconsin 
 Christ Episcopal Church (La Crosse, Wisconsin), a historic Episcopal church in the Episcopal Diocese of Eau Claire
 Christ Episcopal Church (Bayfield, Wisconsin), listed on the N.R.H.P. in Bayfield County

Wyoming 
 Christ Episcopal Church and Rectory (Douglas, Wyoming), listed on the NRHP in Converse County

See also 
 Christ Church (disambiguation)
 Episcopal Church (United States)